SO3 may refer to

Sulfur trioxide, a chemical compound of sulfur and the anhydride of sulfuric acid
Sulfite, a chemical ion composed of sulfur and oxygen with a 2− charge
SO(3), the special orthogonal group in 3 dimensions; the rotations that can be given an object in 3-space
Star Ocean: Till the End of Time, the third main game in the Star Ocean series
A staff officer of the third class, usually a junior officer
 Special Operations 3 - Planning, of SOE (Special Operations Executive, British, World War II)
SO3, a TL9000 metric defined as the number of service impact product-attributable outages per NU (normalization unit) per year